Podzaymishche is a rural locality (a settlement) in Trusovsky Selsoviet, Kuryinsky District, Altai Krai, Russia. The population was 43 as of 2013. There is 1 street.

Geography 
Podzaymishche is located on the Kukuyka River, 22 km northeast of Kurya (the district's administrative centre) by road. Trusovo is the nearest rural locality.

References 

Rural localities in Kuryinsky District